The Lockhart River is a river in Queensland, Australia.

The headwaters of the river rise under Chester Peak in the Chester Range, part of the Great Dividing Range, and flows northwards. It continues past High Range and Heming Range eventually discharging into Lloyd Bay in the Coral Sea.

Named by the explorer Robert Logan Jack in 1880 after his friend Hugh Lockhart.

See also

References

Rivers of Far North Queensland
Bodies of water of the Coral Sea